Ein Hemed is a national park and nature reserve in the hills seven kilometres west of modern Jerusalem and some 12 kilometres west of the Old City. It is also known by the Latin name it received from the Crusaders, Aqua Bella, and as Khirbat Iqbalā in Arabic. The park is located on the path of an old Roman road, also used in later periods. The road connected the coastal plain with Jerusalem, passing through Bab al-Wad. A fortified Hospitaller building from the Crusader period, relatively well preserved, is arguably the main attraction beside the streams and lush vegetation.

Name
The Crusaders named it "Aqua Bella" in Latin, a name which was corrupted in Arabic to Iqbalā, thus becoming Khirbet Iqbalā, "Iqbalā Ruins". The 19th-century Arabic name was Deir el-Benat, also spelled Dayr al-Banat, "convent of the maidens" and  "Khurbet Ikbala", interpreted at the time to mean "The ruin of prosperity"; perhaps "the southern ruin", or "the ruin opposite."

History

Crusader courtyard building

The Kingdom of Jerusalem built fortresses along the road to Jerusalem in order to control the traffic to Jerusalem, and protect pilgrims visiting the Holy City. Farms were built using the spring water for irrigation.

Impressive ruins of a 30x40 metre Crusader courtyard building, whose southern wall survives to a height of 12 metres, are located on the north site of the riverbed. The building has several gates and two arched halls. Archaeological investigations indicate that it was built in  1140-1160, during the reign of Fulk of Jerusalem, in the same period as the fortresses on Tzova and Abu Ghosh. South of the building are a nature reserve and a Muslim cemetery.

Mandate period

The castle is shown as Khirbat Iqbalā on the 1880 PEF Survey of Palestine map, and as El Burj ("The Tower)" on the 1940s Survey of Palestine map.

The of Ein Hemed was historically on the village lands of Beit Naqquba. The village was depopulated in 1948 (its inhabitants returning to create Ein Naqquba in 1962) and was replaced by the moshav of Beit Nekofa.

Nachalat Yitzchak
In 1925, an American Jew named Isaac Segal Feller purchased a plot of 600 dunams on a hill above the springs. This land was called "Nachalat Yitzchak" or "Kiryat YaSaF" after its founder. During the 1936–1939 Arab revolt and 1948 Arab–Israeli War, it served as a base for Hagana training and military operations. Since 1994, there have been disputes over development of the site for residential or tourism purposes.

National park and nature reserve
The nature reserve and park were established in 1968. The cemetery includes the grave of Sheikh Abdullah, in whose honour the oak and terebinth trees in the nature reserve were never cut down. A picnic site has been created nearby. Four layer springs issue from the riverbed and nearby caves, and unite into a flow of water which continues for about 400 metre. Several dams have been built, creating pools, the largest of which is 20 x 20 metres and 1 metre deep.

See also
Tourism in Israel
National Parks of Israel

References

Bibliography

 (p. 22)
 
  (pp. 114−115; 165)
 (pp. 278−279)
 
 (pp. 239−250) 
 (p.   267) 
 (p. 51, No 205)  

  (p. 77)

External links
Survey of Western Palestine, Map 17: IAA, Wikimedia commons 

National parks of Israel
Protected areas established in 1968
Crusader castles
Archaeological sites in Israel
Protected areas of Central District (Israel)
Buildings and structures in Central District (Israel)
Castles and fortifications of the Knights Hospitaller